Waxwork or waxworks may refer to:

 Wax museum, a museum for a collection of wax figures
 Wax sculpture
 Celastrus scandens, a plant in the family Celastraceae
 Waxwork (film), a 1988 comedy/horror film
Waxwork II: Lost in Time, a sequel
 Waxworks (film), a 1924 German silent film
 Waxworks (1983 video game), a 1983 computer game for the Commodore 64 by Molimerx
 Waxworks (1992 video game), a 1992 computer game for the Amiga and PC by HorrorSoft
 Waxworks: Some Singles 1977–1982, a compilation by the band XTC
 Waxworks (band), a Sydney  post-punk and alternative band from the mid 1980s to the early 1990s

See also
 Wax Works, a 1934 animated short featuring Oswald the Lucky Rabbit